Band of the Hand is a 1986 American action crime neo noir thriller film directed by Paul Michael Glaser starring Stephen Lang, Leon Robinson, James Remar, Lauren Holly, and Laurence Fishburne.

The film's score was composed and performed by Michel Rubini and the title track was written and performed by Bob Dylan, backed by Tom Petty and the Heartbreakers.

Plot
A group of five juvenile delinquents in their teens are doomed to be prosecuted as adults for their crimes unless they take part in a new and experimental "program" led by a Vietnam veteran Native American named "Indian Joe" Tegra (Stephen Lang). The five teens include two rival gang leaders, Ruben Pacheco (Michael Carmine), the leader of the Home Boys serving a three-year sentence for aggravated assault and armed robbery; Moss Roosevelt (Leon Robinson), the leader of the 27th Avenue Players, also serving a three-year sentence, for assault and armed robbery; Carlos Aragon (Danny Quinn), a drug trafficker serving a four-year sentence after being arrested in a police sting; James Lee "J.L." MacEwen (John Cameron Mitchell), the youngest and most violent of the teenagers, serving a 10-year sentence for manslaughter of his abusive and alcoholic father and various arson charges; and Dorcey Bridger (Al Shannon), a car thief serving three-plus years for auto theft and over 15 escape attempts from various juvenile halls.

Forced into the swamps, the teens must learn to survive in the dangerous swamp and how to work together. Upon completion of the program, the group buys a vacant house in a dangerous part of Miami and slowly rebuilds the neighborhood, kicking out the pimps, prostitutes and drug dealers. This offends the former illegal inhabitants of their house, all loyal customers of drug baron Cream (Laurence Fishburne). The conflict leads to armed fights, in which Joe is killed. The surviving members of the group take the fight directly to a drug manufacturing facility that is equipped with an M-134 Minigun.

Cast
Stephen Lang as Joe Tegra 
Michael Carmine as Ruben Julian Pacecho
Lauren Holly as Nikki 
Leon Robinson as Moss Roosevelt
John Cameron Mitchell as James Lee MacEwen 
Danny Quinn as Carlos Rene Aragon
Al Shannon as Dorcey Jon Bridger
Paul Calderon as Tito
James Remar as Nestor
Larry Fishburne as Cream

Reception
On review aggregator website Rotten Tomatoes, the film holds an approval rating of 13%, based on 8 reviews, and an average rating of 3.5/10.

Critics have described the film as "a poor 1970s vigilante movie produced a decade too late." At the 1986 Stinkers Bad Movie Awards, the film was nominated for Worst Picture but lost to Howard the Duck.

References

External links

1986 films
1986 directorial debut films
1980s crime thriller films
American action thriller films
American crime thriller films
Films directed by Paul Michael Glaser
Films set in Miami
TriStar Pictures films
1980s English-language films
1980s American films